This list of science communication awards is an index of articles about notable awards for science communication, including journalism and books. The list is organized by the country of the sponsoring organization, although awards may not be restricted to people in that country.

List

See also

 Lists of awards
 List of journalism awards
 List of writing awards#Science writing awards
 List of education awards

References

 
Science communications